I Heard You Paint Houses: Frank "The Irishman" Sheeran and Closing the Case on Jimmy Hoffa is a 2004 work of narrative nonfiction written by  former homicide prosecutor, investigator and defense attorney Charles Brandt that chronicles the life of Frank Sheeran, an alleged mafia hitman who confesses the crimes he committed working for the Bufalino crime family.

The title is in reference to, according to Sheeran, the first conversation he had with Hoffa over the phone, where Hoffa started by saying, "I heard you paint houses"—a mob code meaning: I heard you kill people, the "paint" being the blood spatter from the gunshot.

Later editions of the book contain 71 pages of back matter largely detailing independent corroboration of Sheeran's confessions that came to light after the book was first published. 

Sheeran's supposed confessions to killing Jimmy Hoffa and Joe Gallo have been disputed by "The Lies of the Irishman", an article in Slate by Bill Tonelli, and "Jimmy Hoffa and 'The Irishman': A True Crime Story?" by Harvard Law School professor Jack Goldsmith, which appeared in The New York Review of Books. Chip Fleischer, the book's publisher, wrote a reply to Tonelli's piece, also published in Slate, calling the magazine's decision to run the article with a title he claims is not supported by the facts "irresponsible in the extreme, not to mention damaging."

Adaptation 
The book is the basis for the 2019 film The Irishman, which was directed by Martin Scorsese and starred Robert De Niro as Frank Sheeran.

References

External links

2004 non-fiction books
Non-fiction books adapted into films
Non-fiction books about Italian-American organized crime
Works about the American Mafia
Jimmy Hoffa